Abdolreza or Abd ol Reza may refer to:
 Abdolreza, Andika, Khuzestan Province
 Abd ol Reza, Shush, Khuzestan Province
 Abdolreza, Lorestan